The Other Side of Abbey Road is a 1970 studio album by American guitarist George Benson of songs from the Beatles' 1969 album Abbey Road.  It was his last album for A&M Records. The front cover is a photograph of Benson by Eric Meola in E 53rd Street, Midtown East, New York City.

Online music service Rhapsody praised the album, calling it "winning", a "delightful release", and citing it as one of their 20 favorite cover albums.

Track listing
All songs written by Lennon–McCartney, except "Something" and "Here Comes the Sun" by George Harrison, and "Octopus's Garden" by Richard Starkey.

Personnel
 George Benson – guitar, vocals
 Bob James – acoustic piano, organ, harpsichord
 Herbie Hancock – acoustic piano, organ, harpsichord
 Ernie Hayes – acoustic piano, organ, harpsichord
 Ron Carter – bass
 Jerry Jemmott – bass 
 Idris Muhammad – drums
 Ed Shaughnessy – drums 
 Ray Barretto – percussion
 Andy Gonzalez – percussion
 Phil Bodner – flute, oboe
 Hubert Laws – flute
 Don Ashworth – baritone saxophone
 Sonny Fortune – alto saxophone
 Jerome Richardson – tenor saxophone, clarinet, flute
 Wayne Andre – trombone, euphonium
 Freddie Hubbard – trumpet
 Mel Davis – trumpet, flugelhorn
 Bernie Glow – trumpet, flugelhorn
 Marvin Stamm – trumpet, flugelhorn
 Don Sebesky – arrangements

Strings
 George Ricci – cello
 Emanuel Vardi – viola
 Raoul Poliakin – violin
 Max Pollikoff – violin

Technical
 Creed Taylor – producer
 Rudy Van Gelder – engineer
 Sam Antupit – album design
 Eric Meola – photography

See also
McLemore Avenue

References

1970 albums
George Benson albums
Albums arranged by Don Sebesky
Albums produced by Creed Taylor
The Beatles tribute albums
A&M Records albums
Albums recorded at Van Gelder Studio